Pomaderris oraria, commonly known as Bassian dogwood, is a species of flowering plant in the family Rhamnaceae and is endemic to south-eastern Australia. It is a compact shrub with hairy branchlets, hairy, elliptic leaves and panicles of hairy, greenish to cream-coloured or crimson-tinged flowers.

Description
The upper surface of the leaves is covered with bristly or felt-like hairs, the lower surface densely covered with woolly white, star-shaped hairs. The flowers are greenish to cream-coloured or tinged with crimson and densely covered with soft, star-shaped hairs. The size of the petal-like sepals varies with subspecies and there are no petals.

Taxonomy
Pomaderris oraria was first formally described in 1858 by Siegfried Reissek in the journal Linnaea: Ein Journal für die Botanik in ihrem ganzen Umfange from an unpublished description by Ferdinand von Mueller. The type specimens were collected by Charles Stuart in Tasmania. The specific epithet (oraria) means "pertaining to the coast".

In 1990, Neville Grant Walsh described two subspecies of P. oraria in the journal Muelleria, and the names are accepted by the Australian Plant Census:

Distribution and habitat
Subspecies oraria grows in near-coastal scrub in deep sand between Cape Paterson and Ninety Mile Beach in eastern Victoria and Badger Head and near Wingaroo on Flinders Island in Tasmania. Subspecies calcicola grows on limestone soils where it is often dominant in shrubland in a few locations in eastern Victoria including the Mitchell River National Park.

Conservation status
Subspecies oraria is listed as "rare" under the Tasmanian Government Threatened Species Protection Act 1995.

References

oraria
Flora of Victoria (Australia)
Flora of Tasmania
Plants described in 1858